, literally "tea hair" in the Japanese language, is a style of bleaching (and occasionally dyeing) hair, found among Japanese teens. The style was once banned at Japanese schools and became a widespread topic of the civic right to self-expression, but discussion of the topic died down due to the ubiquity of the style.

Etymology
Chapatsu originally referred to a variety of colors of hair dye, including blonde, red, orange, and blue, it now refers to a brown-tea hue. In Japanese the word is also frequently written in hiragana syllabary.

Style 
While the style itself began to show up in Tokyo streets during the early to mid-1990s, chapatsu was first described in Imidas, an annual publication of new words and concepts in the Japanese language, in 1997. Chapatsu did not appear in Kōjien, an authoritative dictionary of the Japanese language, until 1998. The style first gained popularity among adolescent girls, seeking to accentuate their tanned skin (rebelling against more traditional definitions of beauty), but quickly grew into the mainstream.
By the mid 2000s, however, trends seemed to indicate that the "chapatsu" as a mainstream style was on its way out.  Alhough chapatsu died out as youth-centered fashion trend of rebellion, it came to be accepted not only on young people but also in certain business settings, and it was established before long as a Japanese fashion.

See also
 Ganguro

References

External links

 Transcript of Speech by Nomura Masaichi of the National Museum of Ethnology on Chapatsu and Ganguro fashions

Hair coloring
Japanese fashion
Japanese youth culture